Grouselands, also known more recently as the Waterman Farm, is a historic farm and country estate on McDowell Road in Danville, Vermont.  The main house is a distinctive and rare example of Shingle style architecture in northern Vermont, and is the product of a major redesign of an Italianate farmhouse built in the 1860s.  The house and immediate surrounding outbuildings were listed on the National Register of Historic Places in 1983.

Description and history
Grouselands stands in a rural area of northern Danville, on the west side of McDowell Road south of its junction with Wheelock Road.  It is, at first glance, a typical 19th-century New England connected farmstead, with a main house, side wing, and barn stretched in a line from north to south.  The main house is a gambrel-roofed structure, clad in wooden shingles, with a pair of interior brick chimneys, a hip-roof dormer projecting from the upper roof, and shed-roof dormers on the steep part of the gambrel, their roofs continuing the pitch of the upper roof.  It is three bays wide, with a single-story porch that runs along the left two bays and around the corner toward the recessed ell.  This porch is supported by Doric columns and adds a note of the Colonial Revival to the facade.  An older porch extends along part of the recessed ell; it has paneled square columns and brackets in the Italianate style, reflective of the house's early appearance.

The property was known to have been settled as a farm as early as 1799, and went through a number of owners in the 19th century, especially during the period of the 1860s, when this house was probably built.  It was at that time a somewhat typically Italianate structure (as shown in early 20th-century photos), and was operated as an inn for a period of time in the late 19th century.  It was purchased in 1903 by Stephen Waterman, an architect from Rhode Island, who oversaw its complete transformation into the Shingle style structure present today.  Waterman's estate also included tennis courts and a nine-hole golf course.

See also
National Register of Historic Places listings in Caledonia County, Vermont

References

Houses on the National Register of Historic Places in Vermont
National Register of Historic Places in Caledonia County, Vermont
Queen Anne architecture in Vermont
Colonial Revival architecture in Vermont
Houses completed in 1865
Houses in Caledonia County, Vermont
Buildings and structures in Danville, Vermont